Markelo Nasto (born 23 July 2001) is a Greek professional footballer of Albanian descent who plays as a midfielder for Greek Super League 2 club Trikala.

References

2001 births
Living people
Super League Greece 2 players
Trikala F.C. players
Association football midfielders
Footballers from Athens
Greek footballers
Greek people of Albanian descent